Lakhanlal Gupta was an Indian politician from the state of the Madhya Pradesh. He represented Arang Vidhan Sabha constituency of undivided Madhya Pradesh Legislative Assembly by winning General election of 1951 and 1957. He was elected to the Lok Sabha, the lower house of the Parliament of India from Raipur, Madhya Pradesh as a member of the Indian National Congress.

References

External links
Official biographical sketch on the Parliament of India website

People from Madhya Pradesh
Madhya Pradesh MLAs 1957–1962
Madhya Pradesh MLAs 1952–1957
People from Raipur district
Indian National Congress politicians
1913 births
Year of death missing
Indian National Congress politicians from Madhya Pradesh